Binde is a village in the municipality of Steinkjer in Trøndelag county, Norway. The village is located in the Stod area, south of the lake Snåsavatnet and east of the lake Fossemvatnet.

Binde was the administrative center of the old municipality of Stod which existed until 1964.  The main church for the area, For Church, lies just south of the village.  The village area has schools, shops, and retirement centers.

References

Villages in Trøndelag
Steinkjer